Sullivan Bay Water Aerodrome  is located adjacent to Sullivan Bay in British Columbia, Canada.

References

Seaplane bases in British Columbia
Regional District of Mount Waddington
Registered aerodromes in British Columbia